Aspidoscelis maslini, Maslin's whiptail, is a species of teiid lizard found in Mexico, Guatemala, and Belize.

References

maslini
Reptiles described in 1969
Taxa named by Thomas H. Fritts
Reptiles of Mexico